Hitesh Kadam (born 5 October 1988) is an Indian first-class cricketer who plays for Railways. He made his List A debut for Railways in the 2016–17 Vijay Hazare Trophy on 25 February 2017. He made his Twenty20 debut for Railways in the 2017–18 Zonal T20 League on 10 January 2018.

References

External links
 

1988 births
Living people
Indian cricketers
Railways cricketers
Cricketers from Mumbai